Rawicz is a Polish-language noble surname of the Rawa coat of arms.

The surname may refer to:

Sławomir Rawicz (1915–2004), a Polish Gulag escapee, the author of Long Walk
Marjan Rawicz, of Polish piano duo, Rawicz and Landauer
Józef Warszewicz Ritter von Rawicz (1812–1866), Polish botanist
Wladyslaw Tomasz Rawicz-Ostrowski (1790–1869), Polish nobleman and military commander 

Polish-language surnames